Jesse Flores may refer to:

 Jesse Flores (baseball) (1914–1991), Major League Baseball pitcher
 Jesse Flores (tennis) (born 1995), Costa Rican tennis player
 Jesse Flores (The Sarah Connor Chronicles)
 Jesse Flores (Patent Attorney)(born 1979), Utah